The Stamey Company Store, also known as Stamey Mansion, is an historic commercial building located at 4726 Fallston Road in Fallston, North Carolina. The brick commercial building was completed in 1927 and added to the National Register of Historic Places on January 10, 2019.

History 
In 1890, brothers Thomas Stamey and Charles Stamey leased John Falls', the namesake for Fallston and Cleveland County Sheriff, storefront. The store was successful: in 1909, annual sales averaged $100,000. After a fire in their warehouses in 1925, the store was replaced with the current fire-resistant brick building, completed in 1927. The company continued to enjoy success until Charline Stamey passed in 1991. Without another Stamey family member to run the business, the store closed in 1994. From 1995 to 2013, the building was leased to a series of tenants. It is currently used as an event center.

See also
 National Register of Historic Places listings in Cleveland County, North Carolina

References

1927 establishments in North Carolina
Buildings and structures completed in 1927
National Register of Historic Places in Cleveland County, North Carolina